Clarence White (1944–1973) was an American guitarist.

Clarence White may also refer to:
Clarence Cameron White (1880–1960), American composer
Clarence Hudson White (1871–1925), American photographer
Clarence White (baseball) (1901–?), American baseball player